Tatyana Rodionova (née Proskuryakova on 13 January 1956) is a retired Russian long jumper who won a silver medal at the 1985 World Indoor Championships. At the 1983 World Championships she jumped 7.02 m, missing a medal by one centimeter.

References

1956 births
Living people
Russian female long jumpers
World Athletics Indoor Championships medalists
Soviet female long jumpers